Nationality words link to articles with information on the nation's poetry or literature (for instance, Irish or France).

Events
 English poet Matthew Prior, while a secretary in the English embassy in France (since 1697), mentions in letters that he has been dining with Nicolas Boileau-Despréaux, a critic and poet (greatly admired in England for his verse) whose poems Prior had lampooned in 1695 and would again satirize in 1704. "Boileau says I have more genius than all the academy," Prior wrote to Edward Villiers, 1st Earl of Jersey in July. Villiers replied, "If you don't come quickly away, Boileau and that flattering country will spoil you." In his 1704 satire, Prior wrote:

[...] Old friend, old foe, for such we are
Alternate, as the chance of peace and war)

Works
 Samuel Garth, The Dispensary
 John Hopkins, Milton's Paradise Lost imitated in Rhyme. In the Fourth, Sixth, and Ninth Books: Containing the Primitive Loves. The Battel of the Angels. The Fall of Man
 Thomas Hansen Kingo, Psalmebog, with 85 of his own compositions; still used in some parts of Denmark and Norway
 Thomas Traherne, A Serious and Pathetical Contemplation of the Mercies of God

Births
Death years link to the corresponding "[year] in poetry" article:
 April 13 – Alexander Ross (died 1784), Scottish poet
 April 17 – Robert Blair (died 1746), Scottish poet
 August 13 (bapt.) – John Dyer (died 1757), Anglo-Welsh poet
 Mirza Mazhar Jan-e-Janaan (died 1781), Indian, Urdu-language poet
 Christopher Pitt (died 1748), English poet and translator
 Approximate date – Leonard Howard (died 1767), English clergyman and "poet laureate in the King's Bench"

Deaths
Birth years link to the corresponding "[year] in poetry" article:
 April 22 – Hans Erasmus Aßmann (born 1646), German noble, statesman and poet
 November 23 – Joseph Beaumont (born 1616), English clergyman, academic and poet

See also

 List of years in poetry
 List of years in literature
 17th century in poetry
 17th century in literature
 Poetry

Notes

External links
 "A Timeline of Poetry in English" at the Representative Poetry Online website of the University of Toronto

17th-century poetry
Poetry